Sadipur bathnaha (848133) is a Hindu village, under warisnagar tehsil in the Samastipur district in the state of Bihar.

References 

Villages in Bhagalpur district